Epidapus is a genus of fungus gnats in the family Sciaridae.

Species
Epidapus Haliday in Walker, 1851
E. alnicola (Tuomikoski, 1957)
E. antegracilis Mohrig & Dimitrova, 1993
E. atomarius (De Geer, 1778)
E. bipalpatus Mohrig, 1982
E. brachyflagellatus Mohrig & Röschmann, 1996
E. detriticola (Kratochvil, 1936)
E. fagicola Hondru, 1968
E. gracilis (Walker, 1848)
E. ignotus (Lengersdorf, 1942)
E. lucifuga (Mohrig, 1970)
E. macrohalteratus Mohrig & Menzel, 1992
E. microthorax (Börner, 1903)
E. montivivus (Mohrig, 1970)
E. postdetriticola Mohrig & Röschmann, 1996
E. primulus Rudzinski, 2000
E. schillei (Börner, 1903)
E. spinosulus Mohrig & Blasco-Zumeta, 1996
E. subdetriticola Mohrig & Röschmann, 1996
E. subgracilis Menzel & Mohrig, 2006
E. subspinosulus Rudzinski & Baumjohann, 2009
Pseudoaptanogyna Vimmer, 1926
E. abieticola Frey, 1948
E. absconditus (Vimmer, 1926)
E. anomalus Mohrig & Dimitrova, 1993
E. bispinulosus Mohrig & Kauschke, 1994
E. canicattii Mohrig & Kauschke, 1994
E. carpaticus (Mohrig & Mamaev, 1985)
E. debilis Menzel, 2003
E. echinatum Mohrig & Kozanek, 1992
E. gracillimus Mohrig, 1994
E. ignavus (Lengersdorf, 1941)

References

Sciaridae
Bibionomorpha genera